Plum Grove is a historic house located in Iowa City, United States. Plum Grove was the retirement home of Gov. Robert Lucas and the childhood home of the author Eleanor Hoyt Brainerd.

History
Built in 1844, Lucas lived there with his wife, Friendly, and several children and grandchildren.  Lucas died at Plum Grove in 1853, and his family moved out by 1866.

Subsequent owners include the Hoyt family, who were associated with the Eleutherian College, and Plum Grove was the birthplace of Eleanor Hoyt Brainerd in 1868. The house was subsequently occupied by the family of Jacob Carroll Switzer, a Civil War hero, and then by a number of immigrant and impoverished families. It was bought by the state of Iowa in 1943 and refurbished as a monument to Lucas.

The house is maintained by the Johnson County Historical Society, but owned by the State Historical Society of Iowa. The house is open for tours Memorial Day through Labor Day on Wednesdays though Sundays, 1 p.m. to 5 p.m. Between Labor Day and October 31 it is open Saturday and Sunday, 1 p.m. to 5 p.m. and by group appointment.

Archaeology

The grounds have been the focus of archaeological research since 1974, documenting Iowa frontier history and changes in farming from 1844 until 1943. Most of this work was led by the now late Dr. Thomas Charlton who was with the University of Iowa's Department of Anthropology. Previous excavations have uncovered house additions, outbuildings, and a large trench full of butchered animal bones.

References

Charlton, Thomas H., Cynthia L. Otis Charlton, Stephen C. Lensink, and James A. Sartain (1988) Historical Archaeology at Plum Grove. Journal of the Iowa Archaeological Society 35:40-69.
Parish, John C. (1948) Iowa in the Days of Lucas. Palimpsest 29:13-18.
Swisher, Jacob A. (1948) Plum Grove. Palimpsest 29:19-32.
Whittaker, William E. (1999) Production of Animal Commodities at Plum Grove, Iowa City. Historical Archaeology 33(4):44-57.

External links
Johnson County Historical Society: Plum Grove Historic Home
Plum  Grove Historic Site - State Historical Society of Iowa

Houses on the National Register of Historic Places in Iowa
Archaeological sites in Iowa
Historic house museums in Iowa
Robert Lucas family
Museums in Iowa City, Iowa
National Register of Historic Places in Iowa City, Iowa
State Historical Society of Iowa
National Society of the Colonial Dames of America
Houses in Iowa City, Iowa